Wheeler Mellette Tillman (born August 25, 1941) was an American politician in the state of South Carolina. He served in the South Carolina House of Representatives as a member of the Democratic Party from 1972 to 1976, representing Charleston County, South Carolina. He is a lawyer in Charleston.

References

1941 births
Living people
Politicians from Charleston, South Carolina
South Carolina lawyers
Democratic Party members of the South Carolina House of Representatives
Lawyers from Charleston, South Carolina